Sommarøy is an old fishing village in the western part of Tromsø Municipality in Troms og Finnmark county, Norway.

The fishing village of Sommarøy covers the island of Store Sommarøya as well as part of the neighboring island of Hillesøya and many smaller surrounding islands. The village is a typical fishing village with great local fishing fleets and substantial fish processing and other industries. Tourism is also important in Sommarøy. There is a hotel and rental cabins are available.

History
The original settlement site was on the neighboring island of Hillesøya where the old Hillesøy Church was located.  This site was where successive churches have stood from the Middle Ages until the late 1800s when the church was moved to Brensholmen on the island of Kvaløya. The main centre of the village moved to Store Sommarøya island around 1900.

Time
On the island of Sommarøy, the sun does not set from 18 May to 26 July, a full 69 days. This is then followed by long polar nights from November to January, when the sun does not rise at all due to the location north of the Arctic Circle.

In June 2019, Innovation Norway conducted a marketing campaigncalled fake news by some claiming that local inhabitants wanted Sommarøy to declare itself as the world's first time-free zone and had petitioned the Norwegian government to abolish civil time on the island. The story was covered in more than 1650 articles which potentially reached up to 1.2 billion people. The value of this coverage was estimated at 11.4 million USD, whereas Innovation Norway spent less than 60,000 USD on the campaign.

References

External links

Villages in Troms
Tromsø
Populated places of Arctic Norway